The 2014 Northeastern State RiverHawks football team represented Northeastern State University during the 2014 NCAA Division II football season, in the MIAA conference. Northeastern State lost every game, their record was 0-11 (0-11 MIAA). All of Northeastern State's games were in the MIAA.

Schedule 

† means homecoming • All times are in the central daylight time.

References

Northeastern State
Northeastern State RiverHawks football seasons
College football winless seasons
Northeastern State RiverHawks football